Jesse Woodard, also known as Chase N. Cashe, is an American songwriter, producer, and musician, best known for co-writing and co-producing 5x Platinum hit "Drop The World" for Lil Wayne and Eminem. An original member of music collective Surf Club (with producer Hit-Boy, songwriter Stacy Barthe, producer Brandon Carrier and several other members), Woodard is noted for working with rappers Drake, J. Cole, and Kendrick Lamar, as well as singer Frank Ocean (then known as Christopher Breaux - a fellow co-writer on Brandy's "1st & Love" from her 2008 album Human), in the early stages of their respective careers.  He is also known for various Troy Ave, Beyoncé, Young Money Entertainment and The Pussycat Dolls productions.

Discography

 Gumbeaux (2011)
 Charm (2012)
 Heir Waves (Deluxe Edition) (2013)
 The Best There Is... (2014)
 The Heir Up There 2 (2015) 
 Cashe Rules 2 (2016)
 We Never Close 2 (2018)
 Mannie Fest (2019)

Songwriting and production credits

Credits are courtesy of Discogs, Tidal, Apple Music, and AllMusic.

Awards and nominations

References 

African-American songwriters
1987 births
Living people